The Involve Foundation (known as Involve) is a leading UK based think tank and charity working on public participation.

Background

Involve is based in Bethnal Green in Central London. Involve's Director is Sarah Castell and the Chair of Involve's Board of Trustees is Ed Cox. Involve was founded in 2004 by Richard Wilson to determine how new forms of public participation can strengthen democracy in Britain and elsewhere.

Activities

Involve's vision is of a democracy where people are at the heart of decision-making.

Involve has worked with a wide range of partners, most recently the Cabinet Office, the Department for Business, Innovation and Skills and NHS England. Past partners include the Home Office, the Department for Communities and Local Government, the Ministry of Justice, the Scottish Government, the Welsh Assembly, the OECD, the European Commission and the BBC.

Key publications

 Room for a View: Democracy as a deliberative system, 2015
 Civic Activism Toolkit, 2015
 Public engagement, not just about the public, 2014
 Can you hear me? Citizens, Climate change & Open Local Government, 2014
 From Fairytale to Reality: Dispelling the myths around citizen engagement , 2013 
 Pathways through Participation: What creates and sustains active citizenship?, 2011
 Talking for a Change: A distributed dialogue approach to complex issues, 2010

See also
List of think tanks in the United Kingdom

References

External links
Involve

Political and economic think tanks based in the United Kingdom
Deliberative groups